Aeranthes aemula is a species of orchid native to Madagascar. It is a heterotypic synonym of Aeranthes biauriculata H. Perrier (1951).

References 

aemula
Orchids of Madagascar
Plants described in 1925